Parliamentary elections were held in Finland on 2 and 3 January 1972.

Background
Prime Minister Ahti Karjalainen's centre-left coalition government lost the Finnish People's Democratic League in March 1971 as they opposed the removal of government subsidies from certain foods whose prices rose, and was forced to resign in October 1971, due to the disagreements between the Social Democratic Party and the Centre Party over the amount of agricultural subsidies. According to some historians, politicians and journalists, such as Allan Tiitta, Seppo Zetterberg, Johannes Virolainen, Veikko Vennamo and Pekka Hyvärinen, an underlying reason for these early parliamentary elections was President Urho Kekkonen's desire to continue in office without regular presidential elections which had been scheduled for 1974. Re-election as President through exceptional means would require a five-sixths majority in Parliament and, according to the above analysts, Kekkonen hoped that such early elections would reduce the number of Finnish Rural Party MPs, and would thus make the exceptional electoral law's passage in Parliament easier.

Kekkonen remembered bitterly the loud and constant criticism of himself and of his foreign policy that Rural Party leader Veikko Vennamo had practised during the 1968 presidential election campaign, and he was determined not to submit himself to such a vicious election campaign this time.  Finland was also negotiating a free trade agreement with the European Economic Community, and most Finnish politicians believed that Finland could get a favourable free trade agreement with President Kekkonen's help.

Results

Aftermath
To most other parties' surprise, the Rural Party retained their 18 MPs. Government formation was difficult due to partisan bickering and the elections' rather inconclusive results. Rafael Paasio of the Social Democrats formed a minority government of his own party in February 1972, replacing the Helsinki city manager Teuvo Aura's liberal caretaker government. Finally, after tough negotiations, Social Democrat Kalevi Sorsa managed to form a new centre-left majority government that included the Social Democrats, the Centre Party, the Swedish People's Party and the Liberal People's Party in September 1972.

President Kekkonen's goal of re-election by Parliament was achieved in January 1973. It was helped by the Rural Party splitting as thirteen of their MPs left to form the Finnish People's Unity Party, and by most National Coalition MPs supporting his re-election.

References

General elections in Finland
Finland
Parliament
Finland